Viktoriia Tsybulenko (born 31 March 1978) is a Ukrainian handball player for Karpaty Uzhgorod and the Ukrainian national team.

References

1978 births
Living people
Ukrainian female handball players